Corwin is a masculine given name which may refer to:

Corrie Artman (1907-1970), American National Football League player
Corwin Brown (born 1970), American National Football League coach and retired player
Corwin Clairmont (born 1946), Native American printmaker and artist
Corwin Clatt (1924–1997), American football player
Corwin Hansch (1918-2011), American chemist and professor
Corwin M. Nixon (1913-2003), American politician
Corwin of Amber, the protagonist of the first five books of Roger Zelazny's Chronicles of Amber

Masculine given names